American Classic is the 57th studio album by American country music artist Willie Nelson, released on August 25, 2009. It focuses on the American popular songbook and standard jazz classics, and includes guest appearances by Norah Jones and Diana Krall.

Recording 
In 2008, Nelson met at his ranch in Austin, Texas with his producer Tommy Lipuma, and jazzmen Joe Sample to select the songs for the album. The twelve songs selected were a collection of classics, that included a re-recording by Nelson of Always on My Mind. A duet with Barbra Streisand was planned for the recording of the album, that ultimately was not performed. The photo in the cover of the album was taken in Nelson's ranch by photographer Danny Clinch.

Reception 

Rolling Stone rated the album with three stars out of five, receiving a mixed review: "Nelson can be kind of lazy [...] he only occasionally sounds like he's trying. [...] But his band pushes the music into airless cocktail-jazz territory, and Nelson often sounds glib and unengaged."

The New York Times praised Nelson's band but criticized his performance of the songs: "(American Classic) follows the lineage of “Stardust” in one sense, with a menu of songbook fare. But in another sense it feels like a capitulation.Its sound is lustrous, its personnel impeccable. What’s missing is the sense of conviction that Mr. Nelson brings to his strongest work. [...] What redeems much of “American Classic” is the singularity of Mr. Nelson’s voice, along with the deceptive shrewdness of his singing".

The Austin Chronicle rated the album with two stars out of five. The publication criticized the arrangements: "American Classic is tender and light, and Nelson inhabits the songs easily [...] Unable to recapture the shock of reinvention that was Stardust, producer Tommy LiPuma rests Nelson's slowly distilled vocals atop a band of jazz ringers that squares the Texan with the tradition rather than upsetting it, and only Joe Sample's piano steps up to push the songs beyond their ready-made standard status".

Prefix magazine rated the album with eight points out of ten. The magazine gave a positive review to the album: "Country star (Willie Nelson) seems quite comfortable flying to the moon and singing among those stars. Nelson’s weathered voice is complemented by refined instrumentals from a collective of seasoned jazzmen [...] At the age of 76, the Texas native proves that there is still plenty of stardust left under his cowboy hat".

Pop Matters rated the album with four points out of five, the bad review focused in Nelson's phrasing and the arrangements: "Nelson’s signature phrasing has become a vehicle for his laziness, as his words sound hollow and forced [...] certain performances sound like a man going through the motions. [...] Nelson’s lackluster vocals put the listener to sleep.  He murmurs the verses, and seemingly wakes up for a few seconds to sing the louder chorus.  Then he goes back to his nodding-out rumblings. While LiPuma and Nelson bonded over Bob Wills and the Texas Playboys and Django Reinhardt, and tried to incorporate those sounds into the arrangements, the sweeping, cinematic string sections do not resemble the Playboys’ fiddle or Reinhardt’s distinct gypsy sound".

The album was nominated at the 52nd Grammy Awards for Grammy Award for Best Traditional Pop Vocal Album.

Track listing

Personnel 
 Willie Nelson - guitar, vocals
 Joe Sample - piano, arrangements
 Norah Jones - piano, vocals
 Mickey Raphael - harmonica
 Diana Krall - piano, vocals
 Anthony Wilson - guitar
 Lewis Nash - drums
 Jeff Hamilton - drums
 Christian McBride - bass guitar
 Robert Hurst - bass guitar
 Jim Cox - Hammond B3 organ
 Jeff Clayton - alto saxophone

Charts

Sources 

2009 albums
Willie Nelson albums
Blue Note Records albums
Covers albums
Jazz albums by American artists
Traditional pop albums